Ludwig Emil Tomas Göransson (born 1 September 1984) is a Swedish composer, conductor, and record producer. He has scored films such as Fruitvale Station, the Rocky franchise entries Creed and Creed II, Venom, and Tenet. He also composed the current fanfares for Warner Bros. Pictures and the new Star Wars brand logo. For his work on the 2018 superhero film Black Panther, he won the Academy Award for Best Original Score and the Grammy Award for Best Score Soundtrack for Visual Media. He further scored the second Black Panther film, 2022's Wakanda Forever, earning a nomination for the Academy Award for Best Original Song for "Lift Me Up" performed by Rihanna.

Göransson is also known for his work on American TV series like Community, New Girl and The Mandalorian, which earned him the Primetime Emmy Award for Outstanding Music Composition for a Series for both season 1 and season 2's finales. He composed the main theme for The Mandalorian'''s spinoff series, The Book of Boba Fett, which debuted in 2021.

As a record producer, he has frequently collaborated with Childish Gambino, producing his studio albums Camp, Because the Internet and "Awaken, My Love!", among others.  Göransson's producing work on Gambino's 2018 single "This Is America" was met with acclaim and accolades, including two Grammy Awards — for Record of the Year and Song of the Year. He has also produced for other recording artists, such as Adele, Alicia Keys, Chance the Rapper, Haim, Justin Timberlake, Kendrick Lamar, Travis Scott and Moses Sumney.

 Early life 

Göransson was born and raised in Linköping. His mother Maria, a florist, is from Warsaw, Poland, and his father Tomas, a guitar teacher, is Swedish. He has an older sister named Jessika. He is named after Ludwig van Beethoven. He began music lessons at a young age and went on to graduate from the Stockholm Royal College of Music. In 2007, he moved to Los Angeles to study at the University of Southern California Scoring for Motion Picture and Television program. It was at that university that Ludwig met Ryan Coogler, for whom Ludwig composed the score for the award-winning short film Fig in 2011 (written by Alex George Pickering), which Coogler directed while at USC. The pair would then work together on Fruitvale Station, Creed and Black Panther.  Soon after graduating USC he began work assisting Theodore Shapiro, a composer known for films such as Along Came Polly, The Devil Wears Prada, Idiocracy, and Tropic Thunder.  Göransson's first break came in 2009 as the composer for the comedy Community.

 Film and TV composer 
In 2013, Göransson's first feature film came from fellow USC graduate Ryan Coogler. Göransson composed the score to Coogler's critically acclaimed drama Fruitvale Station, based on the fatal shooting of 22-year-old Oscar Grant on 1 January 2009. The film won the Grand Jury Prize and Audience awards in the Dramatic category at the 2013 Sundance Film Festival, also taking home the Avenir Prize and Un Certain Regard awards at the Cannes Film Festival.

In August 2013, Göransson signed a management deal as a composer for Jay-Z's label, Roc Nation. That year he also composed the music for the movie We're the Millers.

In 2015, Coogler and Göransson again worked together this time on the critically acclaimed Rocky franchise film Creed. By 2016–17, he was scoring True Memoirs of an International Assassin, Central Intelligence and Everything, Everything.

In 2018, Göransson and Coogler came together for their third collaboration, Black Panther. Göransson set out to create a score that would sit somewhere between traditional African instrumentation and a traditional superhero score. In order to do this he travelled to Senegal to research traditional African music and instruments. There he met musician Baaba Maal whose voice is featured in the score who sings in his native Fula language. He later traveled to the International Library of African Music in South Africa, founded by Hugh Tracey, where he listened to recordings of traditional musicians to ensure the score had a culturally traditional sound. In 2019, Göransson's score for Black Panther won the Academy Award for Best Original Score and the Grammy Award for Best Score Soundtrack for Visual Media.

On 22 May 2019, it was announced that Göransson was composing the film score for Christopher Nolan's Tenet. He worked on original songs and music with Justin Timberlake for the 2020 film Trolls World Tour.

Since 2019, Göransson has composed the score for the Disney+ television series The Mandalorian, which is set in the Star Wars universe, as well as the fanfare for the franchise's brand logo. He won the Primetime Emmy Award for Outstanding Music Composition for a Series for both season 1 and season 2's finales. In 2021, he started scoring sessions for The Mandalorian's spinoff series, The Book of Boba Fett, which premiered on 29 December 2021.

In 2021, he was chosen to be the composer of the new fanfare for Warner Bros. Pictures, which combines a new arrangement of "As Time Goes By" with elements of the original Max Steiner fanfare.

In 2022, he worked on the scores of the Pixar film Turning Red and the second Black Panther installment, Wakanda Forever. For the latter, he co-wrote the song "Lift Me Up" performed by Rihanna, which earned him a nomination for the Academy Award for Best Original Song.

He will work for a second time with Christopher Nolan on his 2023 film Oppenheimer.

 Record producer 
In 2010, when Donald Glover first approached Göransson about his side project, Childish Gambino, the two were working on the set of Community. Since then they have released four albums: Camp, Because the Internet, "Awaken, My Love!", and 3.15.20. Göransson served as producer and writer for every song on the album "Awaken, My Love!", inspired by Parliament-Funkadelic and black power music of the '70s. In November, they earned four Grammy nominations for their work, including Album of the Year and Record of the Year for "Redbone". Overall, his work with Gambino earned him six Grammy Award nominations

In 2012, Göransson produced HAIM's debut EP and helped establish the band with a brand new sound on the song "Forever". He also produced two songs on HAIM's debut album Days Are Gone''.

On 5 May 2018, "This Is America" was released. Produced by Gambino and Ludwig Göransson, the song features a gospel-style choir and background contributions from various American rappers Young Thug, Slim Jxmmi, BlocBoy JB, 21 Savage, Quavo and Offset.  "This Is America" debuted at number one on the US Billboard Hot 100, becoming the 31st song to do so in the chart's history. The song won in all four of its nominated categories at the 61st Annual Grammy Awards for Record of the Year, Song of the Year, Best Rap/Sung Performance, and Best Music Video.

Personal life 
Göransson is married to American violinist Serena McKinney. They were married in 2018, and their son Apollo was born in 2019.

Discography

Awards and nominations

References

External links 

1984 births
Animated film score composers
Best Original Music Score Academy Award winners
Grammy Award winners
Hollywood Records artists
Interscope Records artists
Living people
Male film score composers
Male television composers
People from Linköping
Primetime Emmy Award winners
Royal College of Music, Stockholm alumni
Swedish expatriates in the United States
Swedish film score composers
Swedish television composers
Swedish people of Polish descent
University of Southern California alumni
Musikförläggarnas pris winners
Ableton Live users